Visa requirements for Australian passport holders are administrative entry restrictions by the authorities of other states placed on citizens of Australia entering with an Australian passport.

 Australian citizens had visa-free or visa on arrival access to 185 countries and territories, ranking the Australian passport 8th in terms of travel freedom (tied with Canada) according to the Henley Passport Index.

Besides visa requirements, most countries specify other requirements for the entry of Australian and other citizens into their countryfor example, that a prospective entrant has no criminal history or health issues, or that there is evidence of sufficient funds or of a ticket for exit.

Visa requirements map

Visa requirements
Each country has a multitude of visa types, each with its particular purpose and requirements. Rules for visits by ordinary passport holders are as follows:

Dependent, disputed, or restricted territories
Unrecognized countries

Dependent and autonomous territories

Other territories

Reciprocity issues
Some countries regard Australia's requirement for obtaining an Electronic Travel Authority (ETA) prior to travel as being equivalent to offering visa-free travel when deciding whether to grant the same to Australians wishing to enter their territory. The United States, for example, offers their Visa Waiver Program to Australian passport-holders, and one of the conditions for joining this scheme is that "Governments provide reciprocal visa-free travel for U.S. citizens for 90 days for tourism or business purposes". However, the United States has required from January 2009 a similar ETA from citizens of Australia and some more countries. This system is not called a visa, but Electronic System for Travel Authorization, therefore the USA still allows visa-free travel for Australians. As of December 1998, Japan has also granted visa-free access to Australians. Other ETA eligible countries and territories including Canada, Hong Kong, Malaysia, Singapore, South Korea (90 days) and Taiwan (90 days) also grant visa-free access to Australians while Brunei grants Australians a 30-day visa on arrival.

Additional rules

Visa exemptions for Schengen states

A stay in the Schengen Area as a whole of more than three months (but no more than three months in any individual member state)
The Australian Government has signed bilateral visa waiver agreements with a number of the individual countries who are Schengen signatories, which allow Australian citizens to spend up to three months in the relevant country, without reference to time spent in other Schengen signatory states. Since these agreements continue to remain valid despite the implementation of the Schengen agreement, the European Commission has confirmed that in practice if Australians visit Schengen countries which have signed these types of bilateral agreements with Australia, then the terms of these agreements override the conditions normally imposed as a result of the Schengen visa exemption agreement. However, amendments are under consideration to restrict exit from the Schengen area only through the territory of the Member State which is a Contracting Party to the bilateral agreement and the authorities of which have extended the stay.

Australia has individual bilateral visa waiver agreements with the following Schengen signatories:

Consequently, Australian citizens can visit the above Schengen member states visa-free for periods of up to three months in each country. If, however, an Australian citizen then visits another Schengen state not included in the list above, the restriction of no more than three months out of a six-month period in the Schengen area as a whole applies. Therefore, if an Australian citizen has already spent three months in one or more of the above Schengen countries, any visits to another Schengen country without a bilateral visa waiver agreement with Australia may lead to difficulties with local law enforcement agencies (e.g. being accused of having overstayed upon leaving a Schengen country which is not in the list above).

A stay in the Schengen Area as a whole of up to three months

Australian citizens are classified as 'Annex II' foreign nationals, and so are permitted to stay visa-free in the 26 member states of the Schengen Area as a whole — rather than each country individually — for a period not exceeding 3 months every 6 months.

During the visa exemption period, Australian citizens are permitted to work in Belgium, Bulgaria, Denmark, Finland, Germany, Iceland, Lithuania, Luxembourg, the Netherlands, Norway, Poland, Slovenia and Sweden. In addition, Australian citizens intending to stay and work in Estonia for up to 90 days can do so without a visa as long as the employer has completed a 'registration of short-term employment'.

A stay in the Schengen Area as a whole of more than 3 months (and more than 3 months in an individual member state)
In general, any person who is not a European Union, European Economic Area or Swiss citizen and who wishes to stay in a Schengen member state for more than 3 months is required to obtain a national long-stay 'D' visa and/or a residence permit. Australian citizens aged 18–30 (or 18–35 in some cases) are able to obtain a national long-stay 'D' visa and/or a residence permit from some Schengen member states on the basis of a working holiday (see below). Schengen member states also issue national long-stay 'D' visas and residence permits for other reasons to those fulfilling criteria laid out in their national immigration policies (e.g. skilled workers, students, au pair).

In general, the national long-stay 'D' visa/residence permit needs to be obtained in advance through the member state's embassy/consulate. However, some Schengen member states offer exceptions for Australian citizens.

 allows Australian citizens to enter the country without a visa and to apply for a temporary residence permit or a 'Red-White-Red Card' (issued to permanent immigrants) after arrival, rather than in advance through an Austrian embassy/consulate.

The  allows Australian citizens to apply for a work visa under a special scheme known as a 'Green Card' (rather than a 'Blue Card' or work permit which is required by most non-EU citizens). The application for a Green Card can be lodged at any Czech embassy/consulate (or, in some circumstances, within the Czech Republic if the applicant is already resident there) and is usually processed within 60 days. Note that 'Green Cards' are no longer issued after 24 June 2014.

 permits Australian citizens intending to stay in the country for over 3 months to enter without a visa and to apply for a residence permit after arrival (whilst for many other non-EEA and Swiss citizens, a residence permit and visa for a stay over 3 months must be applied for in advance at a German foreign mission).

 permits Australian citizens to stay and work in Estonia for more than 90 days but less than 6 months as long as they obtain a category 'D' long-stay visa at a cost of €80 in advance at an Estonian foreign mission after the employer has completed a 'registration of short-term employment'. Australian citizens intending to stay and work in Estonia for more than 6 months can apply for a temporary residence permit for employment after arrival in the country.

 allows Australian citizens who wish to stay for more than 90 days in the country to apply for a residence card from the regional directorate of the Office of Immigration and Nationality within 90 days of arrival and do not need to obtain a residence permit prior to arrival in Hungary (unlike most other non-EEA and Swiss foreign nationals).

 permits Australian citizens intending to stay in the country for over 3 months as self-employed persons or as businesspersons to enter Latvia without a visa and to apply for a residence permit after arrival (whilst for many non-EEA and Swiss citizens, an application for a residence permit must be lodged in advance at a Latvian foreign mission).

 exempts Australian citizens from the requirement to obtain a Schengen category "D" visa (the visa issued for long term stays in The Netherlands of over 90 days, known in Dutch as the "MVV" visa) - an exemption which goes beyond the visa waiver afforded to most other non-EEA and non-Swiss foreign nationals who are usually only given a visa waiver of up to 90 days in a 180-day period.

 permits Australian citizens who have qualifications as a skilled worker to stay in the country without a visa for up to 6 months to seek employment as a skilled worker or a specialist (except as a religious leader/teacher or an ethnic cook), as long as they register with the police within 3 months of arriving in Norway.

Visa exemptions and requirements for the United Kingdom
Australian citizens are able to visit the United Kingdom for up to 6 months (or 3 months if they enter from the Republic of Ireland) without the need to apply for a visa as long as they fulfil all of the following criteria:
 they do not work during their stay in the UK
 they must not register a marriage or register a civil partnership during their stay in the UK
 they can present evidence of sufficient money to fund their stay in the UK (if requested by the border inspection officer)
 they intend to leave the UK at the end of their visit and can meet the cost of the return/onward journey
 they have completed a landing card and submitted it at passport control unless in direct transit to a destination outside the Common Travel Area
 if under the age of 18, they can demonstrate evidence of suitable care arrangements and parental (or guardian's) consent for their stay in the UK

However, even though, strictly speaking, they are not required to apply for a visa if they satisfy all of the above criteria, an Australian citizen who falls into any of the following categories has been strongly advised by the UK Border Agency (replaced by UK Visas and Immigration) to apply for a visa prior to travelling to the UK if they:
 have any unspent criminal convictions in any country
 have previously been refused or breached the terms of any entry to the UK, or been deported or otherwise removed from the UK
 have previously applied for a visa and been refused one
 have been warned by a UK official that they should obtain a visa before travelling to the UK

Australian citizens who were born before 1983  and qualify for the right of abode are able to live and work in the United Kingdom indefinitely.

Australian citizens with a grandparent born either in the United Kingdom, Channel Islands or Isle of Man at any time or in the Republic of Ireland on or before 31 March 1922 can apply for UK Ancestry Entry Clearance, which enables them to work in the UK for five years, after which they can apply to settle indefinitely.

Australian citizens aged 18 to 30 can apply for a Youth Mobility Scheme visa which allows them to pursue a working holiday in the UK for two years. In June 2021, the Australian and UK governments announced that their reciprocal working holiday scheme would soon be expanded to allow citizens of both countries aged 18 to 35 live and work in the other country for up to three years. These changes are expected to either in 2023 or by mid-2024 at the latest.

Visa exemption for New Zealand
By virtue of the Trans-Tasman Travel Arrangement, Australian citizens are exempt from the requirement to hold a permit on arrival in New Zealand and may reside or work for an indefinite period as long as:
 they present a valid Australian passport OR hold a foreign passport showing their Australian Citizen Endorsement or Australian Citizen Declaratory Visa (either with a label or a confirmation letter) as evidence of their Australian citizenship
 they have no criminal convictions
 they have no untreated tuberculosis
 they have not been deported, excluded or removed from any country

Travel ban

It is an offence for Australians to travel or remain in Declared Areas.

APEC Business Travel Card

Holders of an APEC Business Travel Card (ABTC)  travelling on business do not require a visa to the following countries:

1 – up to 90 days
2 – up to 60 days
3 – up to 59 days

The card must be used in conjunction with a passport and has the following advantages:
undertake legitimate business in participating economies
expedited border crossing in all member economies, including transitional members
expedited scheduling of visa interview (USA)

Consular protection of Australian citizens abroad

There are currently over 100 Australian missions overseas.

In some countries Australians may also receive consular assistance from Canadian missions under the Canada–Australia Consular Services Sharing Agreement.

Foreign travel statistics

Non-visa restrictions

See also

Visa policy of Australia
Australian passport

Notes

References

Australia
Foreign relations of Australia